Wassaf or Vassaf Abdallah ibn Faḍlallah Sharaf al-Din Shīrāzī (fl. 1265–1328) was a 14th-century Persian historian of the Ilkhanate. Waṣṣāf, sometimes lengthened to Waṣṣāf al-Ḥaḍrat or Vassaf-e Hazrat, is a title meaning "Court Panegyrist".

A native of Shiraz, Wassaf was a tax administrator in Fars during the reigns of Ghazan Mahmud and Öljaitü.

He is the author of the historical work Tārīkḣ-i Waṣṣāf, also known as Tajziyat al-amṣār wa-tazjiyat al-a'ṣār (The allocation of cities and the propulsion of epochs).

Tarik-i Wassaf
His history, Tajziyat al-amṣār wa-tazjiyat al-a'ṣār (The allocation of cities and the propulsion of epochs) also called Tārīkḣ-i Waṣṣāf, was conceived as a continuation of Juwayni's Tārīkḣ-i Jahāngushāy whose account of the rise of the Mongol Empire ended in 1257.

Tārīkḣ-i Waṣṣāf consisted of an introduction and five volumes. The first volume (first part) only was edited and translated by Joseph von Hammer-Purgstall, published 1855.

Wassaf's florid style of prose is not easily followed by modern readers, and an abridged version entitled the Taḥrīr-i Tārīkḣ-i Waṣṣāf (1346/1967) has been edited by ʿAbd al-Muḥammad Āyatī.

References
Citations

Bibliography
 
  

Bibliography

14th-century Iranian historians
14th-century Persian-language writers
Year of death unknown
Year of birth unknown
Ilkhanate historians
Officials of the Ilkhanate